Amphidromus djajasasmitai is a species of air-breathing land snail, a terrestrial pulmonate gastropod mollusc in the family Camaenidae.

Distribution 
This species is found in Sumatra, Indonesia.

References 

djajasasmitai
Gastropods described in 1993
Endemic fauna of Sumatra